Jung-myung is a Korean masculine given name. Its meaning differs based on the hanja used to write each syllable of the name. There are 75 hanja with the reading "jung" and 19 hanja with the reading "myung" on the South Korean government's official list of hanja which may be registered for use in given names. 

People with this name include:
Chun Jung-myung (born 1980), South Korean actor
Cho Jung-myung (born 1993), South Korean luger
Lee Jung-myung, South Korean novelist

Fictional characters with this name include:
Joo Jung-myung, in 2012 South Korean television series Missing You

See also
List of Korean given names

References

Korean masculine given names